James Joseph Hogan (July 6, 1837September 8, 1914) was a Canadian American immigrant, grocer, Democratic politician, and Wisconsin pioneer.

Biography
Hogan was born on July 6, 1837, in St. John's, Newfoundland Colony. He worked in the grocery business in La Crosse, Wisconsin. Logan was also involved in the logging and lumber business. Hogan served as mayor of La Crosse in 1875 and 1876. He died on September 8, 1914.

Assembly career
Hogan was a member of the Wisconsin State Assembly during the 1889 and 1891 sessions. In 1891, he was selected as Speaker. He was a Democrat.

References

External links
Wisconsin Historical Society
The Political Graveyard

1837 births
1914 deaths
Mayors of La Crosse, Wisconsin
Speakers of the Wisconsin State Assembly
Democratic Party members of the Wisconsin State Assembly
Politicians from St. John's, Newfoundland and Labrador
Pre-Confederation Canadian emigrants to the United States
Businesspeople from Wisconsin
19th-century American politicians
19th-century American businesspeople